The raised fist, or the clenched fist, is a long-standing image of mixed meaning, often a symbol of political solidarity. It is also a common symbol of communism, socialism, and other revolutionary social movements. It can also represent a salute to express unity, strength, or resistance.

History

The origin of the raised fist as either a symbol or gesture is unclear. Its use in trade unionism, anarchism, and the labor movement had begun by the 1910s. William "Big Bill" Haywood, a founding member of the Industrial Workers of the World, used the metaphor of a fist as something greater than the sum of its parts during a speech at the 1913 Paterson silk strike. Journalist and socialist activist John Reed described hearing a similar description from a participant in the strike. A large raised fist rising from a crowd of striking workers was used to promote a mass strike in Budapest in 1912. In the United States, clenched fist was described by the magazine Mother Earth as "symbolical of the social revolution" in 1914.

The use of the fist as a salute by communists and antifascists is first evidenced in 1924, when it was adopted for the Communist Party of Germany's Roter Frontkämpferbund ("Alliance of Red Front-Fighters"). In reaction, the Nazi Party adopted the well-known Roman salute two years later. The gesture of the raised fist was apparently known in the United States as well, and is seen in a photograph from a May Day march in New York City in 1936. It is perhaps best known in this era from its use during the Spanish Civil War of 1936–1939, as a greeting by the Republican faction, and known as the "Popular Front salute" or the "anti-fascist salute".

The graphic symbol was popularised in 1948 by Taller de Gráfica Popular, a print shop in Mexico that used art to advance revolutionary social causes. Its use spread through the United States in the 1960s after artist and activist Frank Cieciorka produced a simplified version for the Student Nonviolent Coordinating Committee: this version was subsequently used by Students for a Democratic Society and the Black Power movement.

The raised right fist was frequently used in posters produced during the May 1968 revolt in France, such as La Lutte continue, depicting a factory chimney topped with a clenched fist.

A raised right fist icon appears prominently as a feminist symbol on the covers of two major books by Robin Morgan, Sisterhood is Powerful, published in 1970, and Sisterhood Is Forever, in 2003. The symbol had been popularised in the feminist movement during the Miss America protest in 1968 which Morgan co-organised.

A raised fist incorporates the outline of the state of Wisconsin, as designed in 2011, for union protests against the state rescinding collective bargaining.

Logo
The raised fist logo represents unity or solidarity, generally with oppressed peoples. The black fist, also known as the Black Power fist, is a logo generally associated with Black nationalism, Black pride, solidarity, and socialism. Its most widely known usage is by the Black Panther Party, a Black Marxist group in the 1960s. A Black fist logo was also adopted by the northern soul music subculture. The fist and rose, a white fist holding a red rose, is used by the Socialist International and some socialist or social democratic parties, such as the French Socialist Party and the Spanish Socialist Workers' Party.

The fist symbol can occasionally be used by competing political movements. In contrast to the above examples, a right white fist, also known as the Aryan fist or the White Power fist, is a logo generally associated with White nationalism. Loyalists in Northern Ireland occasionally use a red clenched fist on murals depicting the Red Hand of Ulster, which is also featured on the flag of Ulster. Irish republicans, on the other hand, have been seen displaying raised fists.

The image gallery shows how a raised fist is used in visual communication. Combined with another graphic element, a raised fist is used to convey polysemous gestures and opposing forces. Depending on the elements combined, the meaning of the gesture changes in tone and intention. For example, a hammer and sickle combined with a raised right fist is part of communist symbolism, while the same right fist combined with a Venus symbol represents Feminism, and combined with a book, it represents librarians. The Gonzo fist emblem, characterized by two thumbs and four fingers holding a peyote button, was originally used in Hunter S. Thompson's 1970 campaign for sheriff of Aspen, Colorado. It has become a symbol of Thompson and gonzo journalism as a whole.

Salute

Different movements sometimes use different terms to describe the raised fist salute: amongst communists and socialists, raised right fist is sometimes called the red salute, whereas in the United States it is widely known as the Black Power salute due to use by many African-American activists. The Rotfrontkämpferbund paramilitary organization of Communist Party of Germany used the right hand fist salute as early as 1924. By this time, the Soviet Union had already established the use of a traditional Russian military salute. During the Spanish Civil War, it was sometimes known as the anti-fascist salute. A letter from the Spanish Civil War stated: "...the raised fist which greets you in Salud is not just a gesture—it means life and liberty being fought for and a greeting of solidarity with the democratic peoples of the world."

At the 1968 Summer Olympics in Mexico City, medal winners John Carlos and Tommie Smith gave the raised fist salute during the American national anthem as a sign of black power, and as a protest on behalf of the Olympic Project for Human Rights. They were banned from further Olympic activities by the IOC, as the rules then in place prohibited any political statements at the Olympics. The event was one of the most overtly political statements in the history of the modern Olympic Games. Tommie Smith stated in his autobiography, "Silent Gesture", that the salute was not a Black Power salute, but in fact a human rights salute.

Nelson Mandela also used the clenched right fist salute upon his release from Victor Verster Prison in 1990.

The raised right fist is used by officials in People's Republic of China when being sworn into office.

Psychologist Oliver James has suggested that the appeal of the salute is that it allows the individual to indicate that they "intend to meet malevolent, massive institutional force with force of (their) own", and that they are bound in struggle with others against common oppression.

See also
 1968 Olympics Black Power salute
 1972 Olympics Black Power salute
 Ave
 Ave Imperator, morituri te salutant
 Bellamy salute
 Bras d'honneur
 Civil disobedience
 Far-left politics
Black Lives Matter Movement
 Hands up, don't shoot
 Heil og sæl
 Lal Salam
 Olympic salute
 Protests of 1968
 Three-finger salute (Serbian)
 Rabia sign

References

External links

 A brief history of the 'clenched fist' image 
 Bitter price of Olympics' iconic image  – from Los Angeles Daily News
 India Faces Maoist 'Red Salute' – from BBC World News
 Aryan Fist article – from the Anti-Defamation League
 Jenna Amatulli: The Raised Fist Emoji Is Social Media’s Resistance Symbol

Hand gestures
Logos
Political symbols
Salutes
Symbols introduced in 1917